Alpignano is a comune (municipality) in the Metropolitan City of Turin in the Italian region Piedmont, located about  west of Turin on the Dora Riparia in the Val di Susa plain.

Twin towns – sister cities
Alpignano is twinned with:

  Riverside, California, United States 
  Fontaine, France

References

External links
 Official website

Cities and towns in Piedmont
Castles in Italy